Chiriquí Fútbol Club was a Panamanian football team that played in the city of David between 1995 and 2002.

History
Chiriquí  F.C. was founded on 1995 by a group business man from Chiriquí including fellow Colombian Enrique París Villegas. The team earned a spot to play in the ANAPROF season of 1995–96 (becoming the first club of the Chiriquí province to do so) during the time where the Panamanian league was divided between the ANAPROF and LINFUNA. Their home stadium was the Estadio Kenny Serracin in David and it was a baseball stadium, after 1999 they would play their home games in the Estadio San Cristobal of David.

Los lobos played a total of 7 seasons in the ANAPROF before disappearing in 2002. In most of the seasons the team would be placed in the bottom half of the general position (mostly the bottom positions close to relegation). Its best run was in 1997–98 where they qualified for the quarterfinals as 6th in the league, but they lost on aggregate against Árabe Unido. On 2001 the team finished dead last with a poor record (in the Apertura championship they did not win a single game) and were relegated to Primera A. Unfortunately los lobos suffered a severe economical problem and were forced to abandon the Primera A 2002 championship before it started. Their place in that tournament was bought by Denis Arce and his newly founded team Atlético Chiriquí who recruited most of the players from the Chiriquí F.C. squad for that championship.

Year-by-year

Defunct football clubs in Panama
Association football clubs established in 1995
1995 establishments in Panama
2002 disestablishments in Panama
Chiriquí Province